Diplacus bolanderi is a species of monkeyflower known by the common name Bolander's monkeyflower.

Distribution
It is endemic to California, where it grows in the chaparral and other habitat in the coastal and inland mountains and foothills from the North Coast Ranges to the Sierra Nevada to the Transverse Ranges.

Description
Diplacus bolanderi is a hairy annual herb producing an erect stem reaching maximum heights anywhere from 2 to 90 centimeters. The lance-shaped to oval leaves are up to 6 centimeters long and arranged in opposite pairs about the stem. The base of the flower is encapsulated by a hairy ribbed calyx of sepals with pointed lobes. The flower has a tubular throat and a wide, five-lobed mouth. It is 1 to 3 centimeters long and pink in color, usually with blotches of white in the throat.

References

External links
Jepson Manual Treatment - Mimulus bolanderi
USDA Plants Profile for Mimulus bolanderi
Mimulus bolanderi — UC Photo gallery

bolanderi
Endemic flora of California
Flora of the Sierra Nevada (United States)
Natural history of the California chaparral and woodlands
Natural history of the California Coast Ranges
Natural history of the San Francisco Bay Area
Natural history of the Transverse Ranges
Plants described in 1868
Flora without expected TNC conservation status